The Marquessate of Samaranch is a hereditary  title of Spanish nobility. The title was bestowed by King Juan Carlos I of Spain on Juan Antonio Samaranch on 30 December 1991, honouring his efforts in support of the Olympic movement as President of the International Olympic Committee.

Holders of the title
 Juan Antonio Samaranch, 1st Marquess of Samaranch (1991–2010) 
 María Teresa Samaranch Salisachs, 2nd Marchioness of Samaranch (2011–)

References

Marquessates in the Spanish nobility
Noble titles created in 1991
Grandees of Spain